The 2020–21 season is Reyer Venezia's 149th in existence and the club's 11th consecutive season in the top tier Italian basketball.

Overview 
Venezia starts the season with the confirmation of all the technical staff as it was the most successful Italian team of the 2019-20 season. As a matter of fact they were the only Italian team at winning something as they won the Italian Cup while the Italian championship along with all the European competition were cancelled due to the coronavirus pandemic.

Kit 
Supplier: Erreà / Sponsor: Umana

Players

Current roster

Depth chart

Squad changes

In

|}

Out

|}

Confirmed 

|}

From youth team 

|}

Coach

On loan

Competitions

Supercup

Final Four

Italian Cup 
Bologna qualified to the 2021 Italian Basketball Cup by ending the first half of the LBA season in the 5th position. They played the quarterfinal against the 4th ranking Segafredo Virtus Bologna.

Serie A

Regular season

Playoffs

Quarterfinals

Semifinals

Eurocup

Regular season

See also 

 2020–21 LBA season
 2020–21 EuroCup Basketball
 2021 Italian Basketball Cup
 2020 Italian Basketball Supercup

References 

Venezia
Venezia